Formula One, abbreviated to F1, is the highest class of open-wheeled auto racing defined by the Fédération Internationale de l'Automobile (FIA), motorsport's world governing body. The "formula" in the name refers to a set of rules to which all participants and cars must conform. Drivers are awarded points based on their position at the end of each race, and the driver who accumulates the most points over each calendar year is crowned that year's World Champion. At each Grand Prix, the driver who completes the quickest lap of the circuit is said to have completed the fastest lap. The driver who set the fastest lap in a Grand Prix was awarded a point from the 1950 season to 1959. This was reintroduced in the 2019 season.

Michael Schumacher holds the record for the highest total of fastest laps with 77. Gerhard Berger has the most fastest laps among non-world champions, with 21. Schumacher and Räikkönen hold the record for the most fastest laps in one season with 10. Schumacher achieved this during the 2004 season, Räikkönen matched this in the 2005 and 2008 seasons.

No fastest lap was officially classified for the 2021 Belgian Grand Prix. Since 2007, the driver with the most fastest laps in a season is awarded the DHL Fastest Lap Award. The inaugural award was won by Räikkönen.

By driver

By nationality

Most fastest laps per season

 Season still in progress.

Notes

References

Bibliography

External links
 Formula One official website
 FIA official website
 StatsF1 – Formula 1 statistics

Fastlappers